Rampart High School is a public high school in Colorado Springs, Colorado, United States. Established in 1983, it is Academy School District 20's second high school. It was awarded the National School of Excellence award in 1989.  It is one of three high schools in Colorado Springs with the International Baccalaureate Programme, the other two being Discovery Canyon Campus and Palmer High School. Its mascot is the Ram.

References

External links
 

High schools in Colorado Springs, Colorado
International Baccalaureate schools in Colorado
Public high schools in Colorado
1983 establishments in Colorado
Educational institutions established in 1983